Artefaktur Component Development Kit (ACDK) is a platform-independent library for generating distributed server-based components and applications.  Services are provided by a C++ framework.

Artefaktur is free software, distributed under the terms of the GNU Lesser General Public License.

See also

Java
Reflection
Serialization
Dynamic Method Invocation
Aspect-oriented programming
Intentional programming

External links
ACDK Homepage

Free computer programming tools
C++ libraries